Dawn Sears (December 7, 1961 – December 11, 2014) was an American country music artist. In addition to her work as a backing vocalist in Vince Gill's band, she recorded four solo studio albums, of which two were released on major labels. She had one single that charted on the Billboard Hot Country Songs charts.

Biography
Dawn Marie Skari  was born in East Grand Forks, Minnesota. She began her career in 1990 with the album What a Woman Wants to Hear on Warner Bros. Records. The album produced two minor singles. Because of her debut album's poor performance, Sears had decided to leave the country music scene. However, she later received a call from Vince Gill, who had asked her to join his road band as a harmony vocalist. According to information provided by Thomas "Duke" Miller, a TV/movie/celebrity expert, Sears was also known for her song "Another Dream Away", which became a theme song for the newer "Bandit" movies starring Brian Bloom. The movies were a reissue to cash in on the "Smokey And The Bandit" franchise.

In addition to singing harmony on Gill's 1992 album I Still Believe in You, Sears provided duet vocals on the track "An Out of Control Raging Fire" on Tracy Byrd's 1994 debut album. In 1994, she was signed as the first act on Decca Records' newly revived country music branch. Her second album, 1994's Nothin' But Good, was issued on Decca, and its lead-off single, "Runaway Train", entered the country music charts. Other singles from the album were unsuccessful, and Dawn exited Decca's roster not long afterward. A self-titled album was released independently in 2002, followed by her first Christmas album. Sears returned to her work as a backup vocalist for Gill. She made appearances on several of Gill's albums, including his 2003 album Next Big Thing. Sears also performed with The Time Jumpers.

In February 2012, Sears was diagnosed with lung cancer, which was diagnosed as Stage 3B in March 2013. She died in Gallatin, Tennessee on December 11, 2014, aged 53.  Sears was married to Kenny Sears (a Time Jumpers bandmate), and had a daughter, Tess.

Discography

Albums

Singles

Music videos

References

External links

1961 births
2014 deaths
People from East Grand Forks, Minnesota
American women country singers
American country singer-songwriters
Decca Records artists
Warner Records artists
Country musicians from Minnesota
Deaths from lung cancer
Deaths from cancer in Tennessee
Singer-songwriters from Minnesota
21st-century American women